The Fourth Cabinet of Lee Hsien Loong of the Government of Singapore was announced on 28 September 2015 following the 2015 general election on 11 September, and came into effect on 1 October 2015. The day after the election, Prime Minister Lee Hsien Loong told the media that he would form the Cabinet within two weeks.

There are seven new office holders, five of whom are newly elected MPs:

In addition, there are three outgoing office-holders: Lui Tuck Yew, Hawazi Daipi, and Lee Yi Shyan. Lui Tuck Yew and Hawazi Daipi had both asked to retire before the 2015 general election while Lee Yi Shyan had asked to step down and return to the backbenches.

Initial composition

Cabinet
Prior to the general election held on 11 September 2015, Transport Minister Lui Tuck Yew announced his retirement on 11 August. All other incumbent office holders successfully defended their parliamentary seats in the elections.

The list of Cabinet ministers and other office-holders was announced on 28 September 2015. In a press conference, Prime Minister Lee Hsien Loong said, "I have given heavy responsibilities to the next generation of Ministers. They will be stretched and tested. They have to prove themselves and must gel together as a team. Soon after the end of this term, we must have a new team ready to take over from me."

Three veteran ministers were named Coordinating Ministers, each of them overseeing a handful of ministries.
National Security – Teo Chee Hean.
Economic and Social Policies – Tharman Shanmugaratnam.
Infrastructure – Khaw Boon Wan.

Several other ministers will have a change in duties:
Vivian Balakrishnan – from Environment and Water Resources to Foreign Affairs.
K. Shanmugam – from Foreign Affairs to Home Affairs, while retaining Law.
Heng Swee Keat – from Education to Finance.
Lawrence Wong – from Culture, Community and Youth to National Development.
Masagos Zulkifli – from the Prime Minister's Office (PMO) to Environment and Water Resources.
Grace Fu – from the PMO to Culture, Community and Youth.

The Ministry of Education and Ministry of Trade and Industry will each have two full ministers, covering separate aspects.

Sources: ; ; .<noinclude>

Ministers of State and Parliamentary Secretaries
Desmond Lee, Mohamad Maliki Osman and Sim Ann were promoted from Ministers of State to Senior Ministers of State.

Reshuffles

Between 1 October 2015 and 1 January 2016

Between 1 May and 11 September 2017

Between 1 May 2018 and 30 April 2019

Between 1 May 2019 and 26 July 2020

</onlyinclude>

Summary

References

Cabinets established in 2015
Executive branch of the government of Singapore
Lists of political office-holders in Singapore